Buzan-pristan is a rural locality (a settlement) in Seitovsky Selsoviet, Krasnoyarsky District, Astrakhan Oblast, Russia. The population was 473 as of 2010. There are 13 streets.

Geography 
It is located on the Buzan River, 37 km northwest of Krasny Yar (the district's administrative centre) by road. Belyachy is the nearest rural locality.

References 

Rural localities in Krasnoyarsky District, Astrakhan Oblast